WeBank is a private Chinese neobank, founded by Tencent, Baiyeyuan, Liye Group, and other companies. Tencent is the single largest shareholder, with an estimated 30 percent ownership share. In 2019, WeBank's estimated valuation was US$21 billion.

Headquartered in Shenzhen, China, WeBank was approved by the regulatory authorities in December 2014, and began its operations in 2015. On January 4, 2015, Chinese Premier Li Keqiang pressed the "Enter" key on a computer terminal at the Shenzhen Qianhai WeBank office, initiating the company's first-ever loan, of RMB 35,000 (US$5600), to a truck driver.

WeBank bank has no physical branches or outlets, and does not rely on property guarantees. Instead, it grants loans through face recognition technology and big data credit ratings. In mid-May 2015, WeBank launched WeiLiDai (Chinese: 微粒贷, 'particulate loan'), its "micro-loan" suite of inclusive financial loan products.

In 2019, WeBank was fined 2 million yuan (US$281,710) by China's national banking regulators for violations that included irregular loan issuance, noncompliance in management appointments, and employee misconduct.

As of early 2019, WeBank was reportedly exploring options for expansion into Australia.

References

External links
 

Banks of China
Companies based in Shenzhen
Chinese companies established in 2015
Tencent divisions and subsidiaries
Neobanks